Charles Church is a now derelict church, the second most ancient parish church in Plymouth, Devon, England. It was founded around 1640, but not completed for many years. It is a Gothic style church, consisting of a west tower, with spire, a nave with north and south aisles, north and south porches, and a chancel with vestry. The tower was completed in 1708, the original wooden/lead covered spire was replaced by a stone spire in 1766.

During the nights of 21 and 22 March 1941, the church was entirely burned out by incendiary bombs during the Plymouth Blitz. When peace came it was decided not to rebuild the church. In 1958, at a service conducted by the vicar of the parish, J Allen James, the church was dedicated as a memorial for the 1,200 civilian deaths in air raids.

There have been several histories made of the church including two written in the early 20th century. Most focus on the fabric of the building rather than the spiritual life of the church and ministers, of whom Robert Hawker was a notable figure. There are several short accounts of his life and some much longer works.

Significance
The church was an important centre of spiritual life for the city for 300 years; boasted a number of important clergy; and was the mother of many existing churches.  Although now a monument, the tradition of ministry at "Charles" is not lost and is carried on by the Parish of Charles with St Matthias, one of its daughter churches a quarter of a mile away to the north. It is an important landmark for the city of Plymouth. The senior church is St Andrew's Church, the mother church of Plymouth.

Founding (1634–1665)

In 1634, the mayor and thirty members of the council assembled and passed a resolution to petition the king, Charles I, for permission to divide the old Parish of Plymouth into two and build a second church.

The reason for a second church was not that the existing Church of St Andrew was too small (it could comfortably seat 1,200 and the population was around 8,000 at the time), but rather one of religious controversy. Plymouth had grown into a Puritan town. This is hinted at by the Pilgrim fathers who felt at home here, "kindly entertained and courteously used by divers friends there dwelling". Being a Puritan town it meant that the High Anglican king did not see eye to eye with the townsfolk on religious matters.

Tensions grew between the king and the town over St Andrew's. In addition to the minister the town regularly appointed a "lecturer" to supplement the minister in his ministry. This lecturer might refute the morning sermon or the minister in an evening sermon. Battles were fought over the choice of ministers for the church and at times the king ordered the town's choice to be refused admission or tried to appoint his own lecturer. With increasing friction, disappointment with the Royalist tendencies of the St Andrew's incumbents, and a desire for Puritan preaching, the solution of creating a second church was mooted.

That King Charles understood this may account for his seven-year delay in responding. In the end Robert Trelawny, who had become Member of Parliament for Plymouth (and despite his royalist sympathy), most likely persuaded a king who was running out of friends in the West Country to act. On 21 April 1641 the letters patent were signed and sealed. An Act of Parliament was passed on 6 July 1641 and given royal assent on 7 August. It cost the town £150.

The act followed the terms of the letter closely but it was more generous than expected and the new parish was larger than requested. The old parish was split in two on a north–south line and the new parish of Charles was to the east. It stretched much further than the town boundaries first envisioned for the new parish, north to Eggbuckland and further east: the Act also stipulated that no clergyman could hold both livings.

The King insisted the church be named after himself. Given the climate before the English Civil War it is perhaps not surprising that Plymouth sided with Oliver Cromwell and the Parliamentarians. St Andrew's came to be known as "the Old church" and Charles Church "the New church", titles that stuck for a long time.

It was well located for the houses of the parish and fairly close to the ruins of a 12th-century Carmelite monastery. Building commenced immediately in 1641 but was halted by the Civil War in 1642 just as the builders were ready to complete the roof and men were needed for the defence of the town. The church remained in that state until 1645 when the town was relieved; staunchly Protestant, it held out against the King's men throughout the Civil War, almost alone in a Royalist West Country.

There is evidence that the incomplete church was used for stabling horses during the siege. However, it seems that some parts were used for worship. A wedding is recorded on 10 May 1644, baptisms from January 1645 and burials from 4 August 1646 (some pages have been lost so there may have been earlier ones). The oldest communion plate is hallmarked 1646 suggesting its early use. Although the church was not consecrated until 2 September 1665, Francis Porter the first minister was in place as the preaching minister at Charles from 1643 as allowed for by the Act. Iron spikes were said to have been driven into the chancel wall and a canvas pulled across part of the church making it useful for worship during the siege. Traces of the spikes have been found in renovation work since. A glance at the map of the besieged city in 1643 reveals that the church is marked but without a roof on the plan.

After the war, work began again, albeit slowly. Money was raised: £100 per annum in 1646 to pay the minister and £500 in 1656 to complete the church. Money problems seem to have continued because the tower was only half finished in 1652. Eventually, the church was finished in 1657 although a spire was not added until 1708 and the tower covered in a cap of wood instead. Once complete the church stood out from the city. No house overshadowed it and the building was said to be of very fine quality. It was one of the leading examples of a post-Reformation Gothic style church in the country. The architect was thought to be a degenerate disciple of William of Wykeham. The church at this time possessed no galleries or organ.

The conveyancing happened very shortly before the consecration twenty-four years after the church was started. Francis Porter, who was Presbyterian, conformed and kept his living and the church was consecrated by Bishop Seth Ward of Exeter on 2 September 1665 (after the restoration of the monarchy). In 1670 the churchyard was consecrated. The consecration caused a little controversy as the bishop wanted to dedicate the church to "Charles, King and Martyr". However, Puritan Plymouth was not to be messed with and insisted the church be named according to the letters Patent of 1641 signed in Charles's own hand. (The bishop succeeded in dedicating the Church of King Charles the Martyr in nearby Falmouth.)

Development and ministry (1665–1941)
Francis Porter died in 1675. There followed four ministers until Thomas Martin. Martin completed the tower with a wooden spire coated with lead (replaced in 1767 with a stone spire).

In 1708 the West gallery was erected. Six bells were added to the church in 1709 and a chiming clock was given in 1719. In the latter half of the 18th century more alterations were made by Dr Robert Hawker. Hawker, an Evangelical, was extremely popular as a preacher and the church must have grown in numbers as in 1815 the North and South galleries were erected.

It is hard to estimate the sittings the church provided. It was clear that there were not enough. Thousands are said to have flocked to hear Hawker preach. Charles Chapel, the first daughter church, was built from the need to provide more space. Certainly, the galleries helped.

The 1851 church census may give us some idea of what a normal attendance would have been like although it is by no means accurate. On 30 March 1851 the attendances were:

Plymouth combined returns
Population: 52,221
Percentage sittings per person: 45.6%
Number of sittings: 23,805
Additional sitting required to seat 58% population: 6,483

From the figures it is clear that the Charles Chapel and St Andrew's figures are estimated and little care was taken over them (if they were returned at all and not estimated by the census makers). The Charles figures have a ring of authenticity about them and this may indicate that they are accurate.

The question of how many sittings Charles had is difficult to arrive at. The church had three galleries in addition to its pews. The church is approximately half the size of St Andrew's. A figure of 900 sittings is given by the one author in 1977 although this is not clear whether or not all the galleries were taken into account. Charles Church was popular and may have been full that morning. Nationally there were a large number of absences on that day so we must presume that the church could seat over 1,000 perhaps 1,200.

On the day of the census there was a total of 2,480 attendances. This is probably made up of a large number of "twicers". In 1827 it was estimated that the parishioners numbered 10,000 and it was clear that there was a need for more churches.

The Victorian period was a boom time for the church building. The 1851 census discovered a need for more sitting (the 58% population noted above). Nationally the population grew from 19 million in 1861 to 30.5 million in 1901. This population growth was in the towns and not in the country. The need became apparent for more churches to meet the spiritual needs of increasing numbers parishioners. People started moving out from the centre of the towns to the suburbs and Plymouth was no exception as the population increased steadily from the early 18th century to 1814. As Charles parish extended a great distance anyway there was a large increase in population.

 
Charles Church went on to spawn eight daughter churches from 1829 through to 1910. The first came about following the death of Hawker. His curate Septimus Courtney was expected by the congregation to become priest. James Carne succeeded him in fact. A protest meeting resulted that led to the building of the first daughter church of Charles in 1827 called Charles Chapel (later it became a parish and was renamed St Luke's). It is only a few hundred yards to the north of Charles.

The church under the influence of the evangelicals was extremely active, and many new church buildings and alternations were made in this time. Charles is no exception and a large number of developments and restorations were made to the building during that period.

Charles Church was a Gothic styled church. It consisted of a west tower, with spire; nave with north and south aisles; north and south porches and chancel with north vestry. The tower was completed in 1708 and was originally surmounted by a wooden lead covered spire. This was later to be blown off in strong winds and replaced by the stone spire in 1766. It was said at the time that witches had knocked the wooded spire off with their broomsticks! The porches were added to the church in 1864. The south porch, located in the centre of the south aisle had a 17th-century pointed outer doorway – this is still visible today in the ruins of the church. The fire caused by the blitz revealed a doorway in the north wall of the church.

Missions interest was growing. In 1896 the "Charles Own Missionary" Fund was started and the first "Own Missionary", Miss Emily Bazerley, went out to the Bihar and Orissa province of India. In January 1901 Miss Ada Pitts sailed for China as the second missionary. The earliest interest before this was a collection taken and given on 17 October 1661 to John de Kavino Kavainsley of the Dukedom of Lithuania, for the printing of the Bible in Lithuanian. In 1961 a third "Own Missionary", Dr Alison Dow went out with CMS to the Bihls in India from St Matthias.

Education was important to Charles Church and its Evangelical ministers. The "Household of Faith" Sunday school started in May 1784 with twenty children. This was the first school of its type in Plymouth. In four years it had grown and a school of industry added. The first permanent place for the school was opened on 7 March 1798 possibly the first purpose-built Sunday school building anywhere.

1837 saw the building of Charles National school in Tavistock Place. This was for many the only National school in the town and set an example by opening for government inspectors in 1849. This was to be a mixed school but became a Junior mixed and senior girls when Charles Shaftesbury school was opened in 1855 serving Senior boys.

Clergy
There have been over 25 incumbent clergy of Charles Church. Some of the more notable were:

Abednego Seller (1686–1690). It was a troubled time when Seller entered the work. Following the revolution in 1688 Archbishop Sancroft was the first to refuse to take the oath of allegiance to William III. Of the seven other bishops and four hundred clergy who become "Non-Jurors" Abednego was one of them and similarly lost his living. He was a conscientious man who found no release from his oath of allegiance to James II and chose to suffer loss than to break his oath.
Thomas Martin (1690–1711) was an Irishman who fled Ireland for safety "from ye bloody rage of ye Irish Papists". Little is known of his spiritual activities in the church, but he was instrumental in the development of the church erecting the west gallery, finishing the tower and raising the spire.
Walter Hewgoe (1711–1712) was controversial. "A very good man in every way" he was regarded as the best man for the appointment. However, there was some delay in the appointment and the Mayor took matters into his own hands. Whilst the majority of the council was out of town the Mayor and eight others chose Hewgoe. The rest of the council was not pleased and the matter went to trial before the bishop's court with the result that he was instituted as vicar. The Mayor, the Bishop and Hewgoe were sued and in the end Hewgoe resigned the living.
Robert Hawker (1784–1827) was the most famous minister of Charles Church. He was sometimes called the "Star of the West", due to his superlative preaching that drew thousands to hear him speak for over an hour at a time. He was a bold Evangelical, caring father, active in education, compassionate for the poor and needy of the parish, a scholar and author of many books, and deeply beloved of his parishioners. At the time of his death in 1827, Hawker had been curate for six years and 43 years its incumbent.
James Carne (1827–1832) was given the almost impossible job of following Hawker. He was a man of strong business ability and tact and he undertook extensive repairs to the church. He was said to "combine the meekness of wisdom and the watchfulness of the Christian pastor". He and his wife died within four days of each other whilst ministering to the poor and deprived families who contracted cholera in the epidemic of 1832.
Septimus Courtney (1832–1843). Had not Carne gained the living, Courtney would no doubt have been at Charles since he was the popular choice. When Hawker died he was the curate and widely tipped to be the next pastor. The nearby Charles chapel (later St Luke's) was built for him instead. Most likely an Evangelical like Hawker, it was said of him that "he made the glory of Christ known and His redemption great subjects of his ministry, and while he laboured diligently in the public preaching of the Gospel, he exemplified his life the doctrines which he taught". It is not surprising that Charles chapel had an external stone pulpit for outdoor preaching (although this was not erected until 1913) and that this protégé of Hawker should exhibit similar qualities to the man himself.
Cecil Augustus Bisshopp (1845–1846) exercised his right as patron of the living and was instituted at the age of twenty-four. The previous minister Charles Greenal Davies was a stopgap minister until Bisshopp was old enough to take the living. Bisshopp was remembered as a charming young man who led a blameless life. He resigned early as his wife was not strong and his own health frail. He moved to Malta where he died aged just twenty-eight.
Henry Addington Greaves (1846–1878) was a great improver and renovator. He restored the spire and tower and conducted much other work on the building. He is remembered as a keen educationalist and in his time a mixed school was erected in the parish. Greaves set an example by placing the school under Government Inspection: as demand grew another school was built in response to their report. He was also the builder of the daughter churches of Charles: St John's, Emmanuel, and St Jude's started to grow their congregations; Charles Chapel built for Courtney now became St Luke's Church with its own parish.

Destruction and recent history 1941–2002

After the Battle of Britain phase of World War II, the air raids on Plymouth were rapidly intensified. During the night of 20–21 March 1941 Charles Church was destroyed by fire. The congregation joined St Luke's for a month and then joined the daughter church St Matthias (as did the daughter church St Augustine for the same reason). Charles Church was encircled by the construction of a roundabout ten years later.

When peace came it was decided not to rebuild Charles. Plymouth had expanded and the population was in the new suburbs not the centre any more. It was decided to turn Charles into a living memorial of the 1,200 civilian deaths in the air raids. On Saturday 1958 at a service conducted by the vicar of the parish, J Allen James, the church was dedicated as a memorial. The commemorative plaque on the north wall reads:

The church is occasionally used for services of remembrance or of special importance and the current Vicar of Charles with St Matthias is responsible for them. Modern use has been for the university carol concerts and a special service of reconciliation between Germany and Plymouth was held there in 2001 with the German ambassador present.

The parish became known as the Charles with St Luke on 11 August 1954 and then when St Luke's was considered for demolition the congregation united with St Matthias becoming "the Church of Charles with St Matthias" on 22 April 1962.

One of the parishioners, Miss Leigh, had mixed feelings about the church remaining a memorial. "It grieves my heart to see it as it is, given that I remember its former glories. I'm sorry, too, that the historic purpose-built Household of Faith Sunday School, the first in Plymouth, was torn down. I just don't know what to think about the church remaining as it is a memorial to the Blitz victims". Miss Leigh was clear about what she felt for the church itself having attended from birth in 1903 "To me the church was particularly wonderful because there I got to know God… When it was blitzed in 1941 it was one of the few things that made me cry. My life seemed to be completely broken on that day."

During the mid-1990s the church again become the subject of renewed debate, partly because it is felt that its setting would be at least overpowered and possibly desecrated by the erection of the controversial Drake Circus Shopping Centre to the North West and because there was a growing campaign to partially restore the church to incorporate some modern glazed roofing to enclose a blitz museum.

Markings and inscriptions

Following the destruction of the church, a Mr G. W. Copeland visited it and recorded many of the historical monumental inscriptions and other ecclesiastical inscriptions. He presented his findings to the Devonshire Association in 1949. Much of what follows is his work:

Within a few weeks of the great raid that destroyed the building, the writer, in company with Mr Cyril Palmer, had the opportunity of paying more than one visit to the ruins, for the purpose of making photographic and other records. As may be expected, every scrap of woodwork, old and new, had been consumed; even the tower had been burned out; and the only part to escape destruction was the modern vestry on the north side of the chancel. All the bells, with one exception, and that was cracked, were broken; and not one mural monument escaped damage. The font was smashed to small fragments, which were collected later to form a small cairn.

The west tower of Charles Church, like St Andrew's, is built of limestone and granite. It is of three stages, divided by moulded strings and at each angle are double buttresses. The spire is octagonal and is surmounted by a ball and vane. The tower bears two date stones; 1657 on the north side and 1708 on the south side.

The East Window of the church was very elaborate and was of a remarkable design for a church built in the 17th century. There was originally a doorway underneath the east window, this had been walled up in 1665: its location became apparent by the damage caused in the blitz.

The following transcriptions come from the work of Mr Copeland, shortly after the blitz on Plymouth:

On the bells
A framed card which hung in the vestry recorded the following:

When the bells lay broken or cracked after falling through the tower the following inscriptions were recorded:

On other monuments

Many monuments in the ruins of Charles Church were destroyed beyond identification. The following are those that remained.

A brass rectangular tablet recording the erection in the north aisle of a window in memory of Admiral Blake, though badly bent, stained and partly fused, bore the following decipherable inscription:

To the Glory of God and in Affectionate Remembrance of Admiral Robert Blake who first established the Naval Supremacy of Great Britain which has ever since been maintained. This window is placed by several English and American Family descendants for the purpose of recording his daring bravery, his splendid achievements and his pure noble blameless character, August 1889. The Memory of the Just is Blessed. Prov. 0. 7.

In the north aisle:
 Marble memorial, inscribed:

To the Memory of Mr William Rowe of this towne, Merchant, a great benefactor the poor, who died ye 27 day of December 1690. Also Frances his wife, who died the 18 of December 1688.

 Black and white marble tablet, inscribed:

To the Memory of John Nicolls Esq, who died the 16th of May 1790 aged 59 years and of Elizabeth Nicolls his widow who died the 12th day of June 1794 aged 60 years.

The epitaph reads:

When sorrow weeps o'er virtue's sacred dust, Our tears become us and our grief is just. Such were the tears she shed who grateful pays, This last sad tribute of her love and praise, Who mourns the best of friends and parents kind, Where female softness met a manly mind. Mourns but not murmurs, sighs but not despairs, Feels as a mortal – as a Christian bears.

 Small black and white marble tablet, inscribed:

To the Memory of Francis Hawker, Daughter of John and Mary Frances Hawker, who died the 16th of May 1818: Aged 24 years

 Small rectangular black and white marble tablet, inscribed:

To the Memory of Mary Frances Winne, Daughter of Sir Edmund Keynton Williams and Catherine his Wife. Nov. 29 1820.
A lower tablet records:

Also her sisters, Caroline Winne, who died Feb 20th 1822 aged 5 months. Caroline Gwyneth Williams died May 10, 1828 aged 9 months. Maud Lewellyn Seys Williams died May 11, 1828 aged 2 years.

 Rectangular black and white marble tablet, inscribed:

To the Memory of James Hawker Esq, A Post-Captain in His Majesty's Navy who died the 23rd March 1786 aged 58 years. And of Dorothea Hawker, his widow who died the 25th January 1816 agd 78 years.

 Monument of black marble, inscription in Latin (translated):

To Moses George Vincent de Batens in Northill, died August 23, 1663 and Matthias, his Brother, died Feb 11, 1683.

 White marble tablet, inscribed:

Here lie the bodies of Samuel Brent Esqr and Henrietta his Wife. Samuel died December 26, 1788 aged 77, Henrietta died February 21, 1784 aged 63. Gratefull affection for the best of Parents has caused this Monument to be erected to their Memory.

 Damaged black and white marble tablet, inscribed:

To Vice-Admiral Richard Arthur, Companion of the Most Honourable Order of the Bath, Second Son of the Late John Arthur Esq of Plymouth. Died Oct. 26, 1854, aged 75. Also Elizabeth Fortescue, his Wife, and the Eldest Daughter of the Late Rev William Wells, Rector of East Allington, Devon. Died Aug. 16, 1853, aged 69. Also Catherine Elizabeth Caroline Henn Gennys, Daughter of the Above, and Wife of Commander J.N. Gennys, R.N. Died Apr. 30, 1861, aged 39. Also Richard William Arthur, Eldest Son, who died on board H.M.S. Iris off the Island of Mauritius, July 20 [no year], aged 19. The monument erected by Edward Fortescue and Oswald Cornish Arthur as a Tribute of Affection to their Beloved Parents, Sister and Brother.

In the west tower – north side:
 Rectangular stone tablet, inscribed:

William Spark of Fryery in Plymouth Esqr, died the 8th day of June in the year 1714. Being the last of his Name and Family in that place. Resurgam.

 An upright rectangular stone tablet, inscribed:

Mrs Anna Harris Rains, Wife of Capt. Stephen Rains of the Royal Navy. Died October 26, 1793 aged 61. Also Captain Rains. Died January 26, 1795. His remains are in the same vault as those of his wife.

In the south aisle:
 White marble tablet, inscribed:

Andrew Tracey Esq. of Gascoyne Place, Master in the Royal Navy for nearly half a century. Died March 9, 1826, aged 81. Also Sarah Tracey, Relict of the above, Died June 9, 1838, aged 79.

 Upright rectangular tablet, inscribed:

Elizabeth, Wife of Sir I. H. Seymour, Bart, Rector of Northchurch, Herts., Eldest Daughter of Robert Culme of Tothill, Rector of North Lewe and Parochial Curate of Plympton St Mary. Died March 6, 1841. Blessed are the pure in Heart for they shall see God. This tablet is erected by her husband.

Bibliography
Pevsner, Nikolaus (1952) South Devon. Penguin Books; pp. 231–32
Fleming, Guy (1987) Plymouth in War & Peace. St Teath: Bossiney Books; p. 40

References

External links

 1889 Photograph of the Charles Church, Plymouth and Its Churchyard
 3D reconstruction of Charles Church in Plymouth (UK) (YouTube)
 for GENUKI page for Charles the Martyr Church, Plymouth, Devon
 Charles' Church (Oldplymouth.uk website)
 Rare picture shows what Charles Church looked like before it was bombed
 Ruins of Charles Church, Plymouth (July 2017 photographs)

British churches bombed by the Luftwaffe
Church of England church buildings in Devon
Grade I listed churches in Devon
Charles Church
Ruins of churches destroyed during World War II
Buildings and structures in the United Kingdom destroyed during World War II